Sisask is an Estonian surname. Notable people with the surname include:

 Siiri Sisask (born 1968), Estonian singer, actress, and politician
 Urmas Sisask (1960–2022), Estonian composer

Estonian-language surnames